X-Bow may refer to:
KTM X-Bow, an Austrian make of car
X-bow (shipbuilding), a design of ship's bow
Crossbow